The 2016 season was Club de Regatas Vasco da Gama's 118th year in existence, the club's 101st season in existence of football, and the club's 3rd season playing in the Brasileirão Série B, the second tier of Brazilian football.

Players

Squad information 
As of 18 May 2016.

from Vasco da Gama (B) (reserve team)

from Vasco da Gama (U–20) (ables to play in first team)

Out of loan

Vasco da Gama – (U–20) 
As of 29 December 2015.

Transfers

In

Loan in

On trial (in)

Out

Loan out

On trial (out)

Match results

Rio de Janeiro State Championship

Rio de Janeiro State Championship squad
The initial report was released on 26 January. The teams involved in the tournament are required to register a squad of a maximum 31 players in total, including 3 goalkeepers and at maximum 5 players under 20 years old (born 1 January 1996 or after).

Early stage

Guanabara Tournament

Guanabara Tournament matches

Final stage

Final stage matches

Copa do Brasil

Copa do Brasil matches

Brasileirão Série B

Statistics

Appearances and goals 

Last updated on 26 November 2016.

|-
! colspan=16 style=background:#dcdcdc; text-align:center|Goalkeepers

|-
! colspan=16 style=background:#dcdcdc; text-align:center|Defenders

|-
! colspan=16 style=background:#dcdcdc; text-align:center|Midfielders

|-
! colspan=16 style=background:#dcdcdc; text-align:center|Forwards

|-
! colspan=14 style=background:#dcdcdc; text-align:center| Players of youth squads who have made an appearance or had a squad number this season 

|-
! colspan=16 style=background:#dcdcdc; text-align:center| Players who have made an appearance or had a squad number this season but have transferred or loaned out during the season

|}

See also 

 2016 Rio de Janeiro State Championship
 2016 Copa do Brasil
 2016 Brasileirão Série B

Notes

References 

CR Vasco da Gama
Club de Regatas Vasco da Gama seasons
Vasco da Gama